In mathematics, a Hilbert modular form is a generalization of modular forms to functions of two or more variables. It is a (complex) analytic function on the m-fold product of upper half-planes  satisfying a certain kind of functional equation.

Definition
Let F be a totally real number field of degree m over the rational field. Let  be the real embeddings of F. Through them we have a map

Let  be the ring of integers of F. The group  is called the full Hilbert modular group.
For every element , there is a group action of  defined by 

For 

define:

A Hilbert modular form of weight  is an analytic function on  such that for every 

Unlike the modular form case, no extra condition is needed for the cusps because of Koecher's principle.

History

These modular forms, for real quadratic fields, were first treated in the 1901 Göttingen University Habilitationssschrift of Otto Blumenthal. There he mentions that David Hilbert had considered them initially in work from 1893-4, which remained unpublished. Blumenthal's work was published in 1903. For this reason Hilbert modular forms are now often called Hilbert-Blumenthal modular forms.

The theory remained dormant for some decades; Erich Hecke appealed to it in his early work, but major interest in Hilbert modular forms awaited the development of complex manifold theory.

See also
 Siegel modular form
 Hilbert modular surface

References 
 Jan H. Bruinier: Hilbert modular forms and their applications.
Paul B. Garrett: Holomorphic Hilbert Modular Forms.  Wadsworth & Brooks/Cole Advanced Books & Software, Pacific Grove, CA, 1990. 
 Eberhard Freitag: Hilbert Modular Forms. Springer-Verlag. 

Automorphic forms